Derriaghy Cricket Club Football Club, often simply known as Derriaghy CC or Derriaghy Cricket Club, is a Northern Irish intermediate-level football club playing in the Premier Division of the Northern Amateur Football League. The club is based in Derriaghy, County Antrim, was formed in 1982 when the long-established Derriaghy Cricket Club decided to add a football section. It joined the Lisburn League before entering the Amateur League in 1987. Its home ground is Seycon Park in Derriaghy. The club also has a 2nd XI in Division 3B of the NAFL and an under-14 youth team.

Honours

Intermediate honours 
  Clarence Cup: 1
 2011–12
 Border Cup: 1
 2021-22

Notes

External links
 Derriaghy CC Facebook Page

Association football clubs in Northern Ireland
Association football clubs established in 1982
Association football clubs in County Antrim
Northern Amateur Football League clubs
1982 establishments in Northern Ireland